André Van Vierst (25 May 1904 – 13 October 1991) was a French racing cyclist. He rode in the 1928 Tour de France.

References

1904 births
1991 deaths
French male cyclists
Place of birth missing